An orange is a fruit of various citrus species in the family Rutaceae (see list of plants known as orange); it primarily refers to Citrus × sinensis, which is also called sweet orange, to distinguish it from the related Citrus × aurantium, referred to as bitter orange. The sweet orange reproduces asexually (apomixis through nucellar embryony); varieties of sweet orange arise through mutations.

The orange is a hybrid between pomelo (Citrus maxima) and mandarin (Citrus reticulata). The chloroplast genome, and therefore the maternal line, is that of pomelo. The sweet orange has had its full genome sequenced.

The orange originated in a region encompassing Southern China, Northeast India, and Myanmar, and the earliest mention of the sweet orange was in Chinese literature in 314 BC. , orange trees were found to be the most cultivated fruit tree in the world. Orange trees are widely grown in tropical and subtropical climates for their sweet fruit. The fruit of the orange tree can be eaten fresh, or processed for its juice or fragrant peel. , sweet oranges accounted for approximately 70% of citrus production.

In 2019, 79 million tonnes of oranges were grown worldwide, with Brazil producing 22% of the total, followed by China and India.

Taxonomy and terminology 

  All citrus trees belong to the single genus Citrus and remain almost entirely interfertile. This includes grapefruits, lemons, limes, oranges, and various other types and hybrids. As the interfertility of oranges and other citrus has produced numerous hybrids and cultivars, and bud mutations have also been selected, citrus taxonomy is fairly controversial, confusing or inconsistent. The fruit of any citrus tree is considered a hesperidium, a kind of modified berry; it is covered by a rind originated by a rugged thickening of the ovary wall.

Different names have been given to the many varieties of the species. Orange applies primarily to the sweet orange—Citrus sinensis (L.) Osbeck. Sweet oranges grow in a range of different sizes, and shapes varying from spherical to oblong. Inside and attached to the rind is a porous white tissue, the white, bitter mesocarp or albedo (pith). The orange contains a number of distinct carpels (segments) inside, typically about ten, each delimited by a membrane, and containing many juice-filled vesicles and usually a few seeds (pips). When unripe, the fruit is green. The grainy irregular rind of the ripe fruit can range from bright orange to yellow-orange, but frequently retains green patches or, under warm climate conditions, remains entirely green. Like all other citrus fruits, the sweet orange is non-climacteric. The Citrus sinensis group is subdivided into four classes with distinct characteristics: common oranges, blood or pigmented oranges, navel oranges, and acidless oranges.

Other citrus groups also known as oranges are:
 Bergamot orange (Citrus bergamia Risso), grown mainly in Italy for its peel, producing a primary essence for perfumes, also used to flavor Earl Grey tea. It is a hybrid of bitter orange x lemon.
 Bitter orange (Citrus aurantium), also known as Seville orange, sour orange (especially when used as rootstock for a sweet orange tree), bigarade orange and marmalade orange. Like the sweet orange, it is a pomelo x mandarin hybrid, but arose from a distinct hybridization event.
 Mandarin orange (Citrus reticulata) is an original species of citrus, and is a progenitor of the common orange.
 Trifoliate orange (Poncirus trifoliata), sometimes included in the genus (classified as Citrus trifoliata). It often serves as a rootstock for sweet orange trees and other Citrus cultivars.

An enormous number of cultivars have, like the sweet orange, a mix of pomelo and mandarin ancestry. Some cultivars are mandarin-pomelo hybrids, bred from the same parents as the sweet orange (e.g. the tangor and ponkan tangerine). Other cultivars are sweet orange x mandarin hybrids (e.g. clementines). Mandarin traits generally include being smaller and oblate, easier to peel, and less acidic. Pomelo traits include a thick white albedo (rind pith, mesocarp) that is more closely attached to the segments.

Orange trees generally are grafted. The bottom of the tree, including the roots and trunk, is called rootstock, while the fruit-bearing top has two different names: budwood (when referring to the process of grafting) and scion (when mentioning the variety of orange).

Etymology 

The word ultimately derives from Proto-Dravidian or Tamil . From there the word entered Sanskrit  ( or ), meaning 'orange tree'. The Sanskrit word reached European languages through Persian  and its Arabic derivative .

The word entered Late Middle English in the 14th century via Old French  (in the phrase ). The French word, in turn, comes from Old Provençal , based on the Arabic word. In several languages, the initial n present in earlier forms of the word dropped off because it may have been mistaken as part of an indefinite article ending in an n sound. This linguistic change is called juncture loss. The color was named after the fruit, and the first recorded use of orange as a color name in English was in 1512.

History 

The sweet orange is not a wild fruit, having arisen in domestication from a cross between a non-pure mandarin orange and a hybrid pomelo that had a substantial mandarin component. Since its chloroplast DNA is that of pomelo, it was likely the hybrid pomelo, perhaps a BC1 pomelo backcross, that was the maternal parent of the first orange. Based on genomic analysis, the relative proportions of the ancestral species in the sweet orange is approximately 42% pomelo and 58% mandarin. All varieties of the sweet orange descend from this prototype cross, differing only by mutations selected for during agricultural propagation. Sweet oranges have a distinct origin from the bitter orange, which arose independently, perhaps in the wild, from a cross between pure mandarin and pomelo parents. The earliest mention of the sweet orange in Chinese literature dates from 314 BC.

In Europe, the Moors introduced the orange to the Iberian Peninsula which was known as Al-Andalus, with large scale cultivation starting in the 10th century as evidenced by complex irrigation techniques specifically adapted to support orange orchards. Citrus fruits—among them the bitter orange—were introduced to Sicily in the 9th century during the period of the Emirate of Sicily, but the sweet orange was unknown until the late 15th century or the beginnings of the 16th century, when Italian and Portuguese merchants brought orange trees into the Mediterranean area. Shortly afterward, the sweet orange quickly was adopted as an edible fruit. It was considered a luxury food grown by wealthy people in private conservatories, called orangeries. By 1646, the sweet orange was well known throughout Europe. Louis XIV of France had a great love of orange trees, and built the grandest of all royal Orangeries at the Palace of Versailles. At Versailles potted orange trees in solid silver tubs were placed throughout the rooms of the palace, while the Orangerie allowed year-round cultivation of the fruit to supply the court. When Louis condemned his finance minister, Nicolas Fouquet, in 1664, part of the treasures which he confiscated were over 1,000 orange trees from Fouquet's estate at Vaux-le-Vicomte.

Spanish travelers introduced the sweet orange into the American continent. On his second voyage in 1493, Christopher Columbus may have planted the fruit in Hispaniola. Subsequent expeditions in the mid-1500s brought sweet oranges to South America and Mexico, and to Florida in 1565, when Pedro Menéndez de Avilés founded St Augustine. Spanish missionaries brought orange trees to Arizona between 1707 and 1710, while the Franciscans did the same in San Diego, California, in 1769. An orchard was planted at the San Gabriel Mission around 1804 and a commercial orchard was established in 1841 near present-day Los Angeles. In Louisiana, oranges were probably introduced by French explorers.

Archibald Menzies, the botanist and naturalist on the Vancouver Expedition, collected orange seeds in South Africa, raised the seedlings onboard and gave them to several Hawaiian chiefs in 1792. Eventually, the sweet orange was grown in wide areas of the Hawaiian Islands, but its cultivation stopped after the arrival of the Mediterranean fruit fly in the early 1900s.

As oranges are rich in vitamin C and do not spoil easily, during the Age of Discovery, Portuguese, Spanish, and Dutch sailors planted citrus trees along trade routes to prevent scurvy.

Florida farmers obtained seeds from New Orleans around 1872, after which orange groves were established by grafting the sweet orange on to sour orange rootstocks.

Varieties

Common 

Common oranges (also called "white", "round", or "blond" oranges) constitute about two-thirds of all the orange production. The majority of this crop is used for juice extraction.

Valencia 

The Valencia orange is a late-season fruit, and therefore a popular variety when navel oranges are out of season. This is why an anthropomorphic orange was chosen as the mascot for the 1982 FIFA World Cup, held in Spain. The mascot was named Naranjito ("little orange") and wore the colors of the Spanish national football team.

Thomas Rivers, an English nurseryman, imported this variety from the Azores Islands and catalogued it in 1865 under the name Excelsior. Around 1870, he provided trees to S. B. Parsons, a Long Island nurseryman, who in turn sold them to E. H. Hart of Federal Point, Florida.

Hamlin 
This cultivar was discovered by A. G. Hamlin near Glenwood, Florida, in 1879. The fruit is small, smooth, not highly colored, and juicy, with a pale yellow colored juice, especially in fruits that come from lemon rootstock. The fruit may be seedless, or may contain a number of small seeds. The tree is high-yielding and cold-tolerant and it produces good quality fruit, which is harvested from October to December. It thrives in humid subtropical climates. In cooler, more arid areas, the trees produce edible fruit, but too small for commercial use.

Trees from groves in hammocks or areas covered with pine forest are budded on sour orange trees, a method that gives a high solids content. On sand, they are grafted on rough lemon rootstock. The Hamlin orange is one of the most popular juice oranges in Florida and replaces the Parson Brown variety as the principal early-season juice orange. This cultivar is now the leading early orange in Florida and, possibly, in the rest of the world.

Other Valencias 

 Bahia: grown in Brazil and Uruguay
 Bali: grown in Bali, Indonesia. Larger than other orange
 Belladonna: grown in Italy
 Berna: grown mainly in Spain
 Biondo Comune ("ordinary blond"): widely grown in the Mediterranean basin, especially in North Africa, Egypt, Greece (where it is called "koines"), Italy (where it is also known as "Liscio"), and Spain; it also is called "Beledi" and "Nostrale"; in Italy, this variety ripens in December, earlier than the competing Tarocco variety
 Biondo Riccio: grown in Italy
 Byeonggyul: grown in Jeju Island, South Korea
 Cadanera: a seedless orange of excellent flavor grown in Algeria, Morocco, and Spain; it begins to ripen in November and is known by a wide variety of trade names, such as Cadena Fina, Cadena sin Jueso, Precoce de Valence ("early from Valencia"), Precoce des Canaries, and Valence san Pepins ("seedless Valencia"); it was first grown in Spain in 1870
 Calabrese or Calabrese Ovale: grown in Italy
 Carvalhal: grown in Portugal
 Castellana: grown in Spain
 Charmute: grown in Brazil
 Cherry Orange: grown in southern China and Japan
 Clanor: grown in South Africa
 Dom João: grown in Portugal
 Fukuhara: grown in Japan
 Gardner: grown in Florida, this mid-season orange ripens around the beginning of February, approximately the same time as the Midsweet variety; Gardner is about as hardy as Sunstar and Midsweet
 Homosassa: grown in Florida
 Jaffa orange: grown in the Middle East, also known as "Shamouti"
 Jincheng: the most popular orange in China
 Joppa: grown in South Africa and Texas
 Khettmali: grown in Israel and Lebanon

 Kona: a type of Valencia orange introduced in Hawaii in 1792 by Captain George Vancouver; for many decades in the nineteenth century, these oranges were the leading export from the Kona district on the Big Island of Hawaii; in Kailua-Kona, some of the original stock still bears fruit
 Lima: grown in Brazil
 Lue Gim Gong: grown in Florida, is an early scion developed by Lue Gim Gong, a Chinese immigrant known as the "Citrus Genius"; in 1888, Lue cross-pollinated two orange varieties—the Hart's late Valencia and the Mediterranean Sweet—and obtained a fruit both sweet and frost-tolerant; this variety was propagated at the Glen St. Mary Nursery, which in 1911 received the Silver Wilder Medal by the American Pomological Society; originally considered a hybrid, the Lue Gim Gong orange was later found to be a nucellar seedling of the Valencia type, which is properly called Lue Gim Gong; since 2006, the Lue Gim Gong variety is grown in Florida, although sold under the general name Valencia
 Macetera: grown in Spain, it is known for its unique flavor

 Malta: grown in Pakistan
 Maltaise Blonde: grown in north Africa
 Maltaise Ovale: grown in South Africa and in California under the names of Garey's or California Mediterranean Sweet
 Marrs: grown in Texas, California and Iran, it is relatively low in acid
 Medan: grown in Medan, Indonesia
 Midsweet: grown in Florida, it is a newer scion similar to the Hamlin and Pineapple varieties, it is hardier than Pineapple and ripens later; the fruit production and quality are similar to those of the Hamlin, but the juice has a deeper color
 Moro Tarocco: grown in Italy, it is oval, resembles a tangelo, and has a distinctive caramel-colored endocarp; this color is the result of a pigment called anthocarpium, not usually found in citruses, but common in red fruits and flowers; the original mutation occurred in Sicily in the seventeenth century
 Narinja: grown in Andhra, South India
 Parson Brown: grown in Florida, Mexico, and Turkey, it once was a widely grown Florida juice orange, its popularity has declined since new varieties with more juice, better yield, and higher acid and sugar content have been developed; it originated as a chance seedling in Florida in 1865; its fruits are round, medium large, have a thick, pebbly peel and contain 10 to 30 seeds; it still is grown because it is the earliest maturing fruit in the United States, usually maturing in early September in the Valley district of Texas, and from early October to January in Florida; its peel and juice color are poor, as is the quality of its juice
 Pera: grown in Brazil, it is very popular in the Brazilian citrus industry and yielded 7.5 million metric tons in 2005
 Pera Coroa: grown in Brazil
 Pera Natal: grown in Brazil
 Pera Rio: grown in Brazil
 Pineapple: grown in North and South America and India
 Pontianak: oval-shaped orange grown especially in Pontianak, Indonesia
 Premier: grown in South Africa
 Rhode Red: is a mutation of the Valencia orange, but the color of its flesh is more intense; it has more juice, and less acidity and vitamin C than the Valencia; it was discovered by Paul Rhode in 1955 in a grove near Sebring, Florida
 Roble: it was first shipped from Spain in 1851 by Joseph Roble to his homestead in what is now Roble's Park in Tampa, Florida; it is known for its high sugar content
 Queen: grown in South Africa
 Salustiana: grown in North Africa
 Sathgudi: grown in Tamil Nadu, South India
 Seleta, Selecta: grown in Australia and Brazil, it is high in acid
 Shamouti Masry: grown in Egypt; it is a richer variety of Shamouti
 Sunstar: grown in Florida, this newer cultivar ripens in mid-season (December to March) and it is more resistant to cold and fruit-drop than the competing Pineapple variety; the color of its juice is darker than that of the competing Hamlin
 Tomango: grown in South Africa
 Verna: grown in Algeria, Mexico, Morocco, and Spain
 Vicieda: grown in Algeria, Morocco, and Spain
 Westin: grown in Brazil
 Xã Đoài orange: grown in Vietnam

Navel 
Navel oranges are characterized by the growth of a second fruit at the apex, which protrudes slightly and resembles a human navel. They are primarily grown for human consumption for various reasons: their thicker skin makes them easy to peel, they are less juicy and their bitterness—a result of the high concentrations of limonin and other limonoids—renders them less suitable for juice. Their widespread distribution and long harvest period have made navel oranges very popular. In the United States, they are available from November to April, with peak supplies in January, February, and March.

According to a 1917 study by Palemon Dorsett, Archibald Dixon Shamel and Wilson Popenoe of the United States Department of Agriculture (USDA), a single mutation in a Selecta orange tree planted on the grounds of a monastery in Bahia, Brazil, probably yielded the first navel orange between 1810 and 1820. Nevertheless, a researcher at the University of California, Riverside, has suggested that the parent variety was more likely the Portuguese navel orange (Umbigo), described by Antoine Risso and Pierre Antoine Poiteau in their book Histoire naturelle des orangers ("Natural History of Orange Trees", 1818–1822). The mutation caused the orange to develop a second fruit at its base, opposite the stem, embedded within the peel of the primary orange. Navel oranges were introduced in Australia in 1824 and in Florida in 1835. In 1873, Eliza Tibbets planted two cuttings of the original tree in Riverside, California, where the fruit became known as "Washington". This cultivar was very successful, and rapidly spread to other countries. Because the mutation left the fruit seedless, therefore sterile, the only method to cultivate navel oranges was to graft cuttings onto other varieties of citrus trees. The California Citrus State Historic Park and the Orcutt Ranch Horticulture Center preserve the history of navel oranges in Riverside.

Today, navel oranges continue to be propagated through cutting and grafting. This does not allow for the usual selective breeding methodologies, and so all navel oranges can be considered fruits from that single, nearly 200-year-old tree: they have exactly the same genetic make-up as the original tree and are clones. This case is similar to that of the common yellow seedless banana, the Cavendish, or that of the Granny Smith apple. On rare occasions, however, further mutations can lead to new varieties.

Cara cara 

Cara cara oranges (also called "red navel") are a type of navel orange grown mainly in Venezuela, South Africa and in California's San Joaquin Valley. They are sweet and comparatively low in acid, with a bright orange rind similar to that of other navels, but their flesh is distinctively pinkish red. It is believed that they have originated as a cross between the Washington navel and the Brazilian Bahia navel, and they were discovered at the Hacienda Cara Cara in Valencia, Venezuela, in 1976.

South African cara caras are ready for market in early August, while Venezuelan fruits arrive in October and Californian fruits in late November.

Other Navels 
 Bahianinha or Bahia
 Dream Navel
 Late Navel
 Washington or California Navel

Blood 

Blood oranges are a natural mutation of C. sinensis, although today the majority of them are hybrids. High concentrations of anthocyanin give the rind, flesh, and juice of the fruit their characteristic dark red color. Blood oranges were first discovered and cultivated in Sicily in the fifteenth century. Since then they have spread worldwide, but are grown especially in Spain and Italy under the names of sanguina and sanguinella, respectively.

The blood orange, with its distinct color and flavor, is generally considered favorably as a juice, and has found a niche as an ingredient variation in traditional Seville marmalade.

Maltese: a small and highly colored variety, generally thought to have originated in Italy as a mutation and cultivated there for centuries. It also is grown extensively in southern Spain and Malta. It is used in sorbets and other desserts due to its rich burgundy color. Moro, originally from Sicily, it is common throughout Italy. This medium-sized fruit has a relatively long harvest, which lasts from December to April. Sanguinelli, a mutant of the Doble Fina, was discovered in 1929 in Almenara, in the Castellón province of Spain. It is cultivated in Sicily. Tarocco is relatively new variety developed in Italy. It begins to ripen in late January.

Acidless 
Acidless oranges are an early-season fruit with very low levels of acid. They also are called "sweet" oranges in the United States, with similar names in other countries: douce in France, sucrena in Spain, dolce or maltese in Italy, meski in North Africa and the Near East (where they are especially popular), şeker portakal ("sugar orange") in Turkey, succari in Egypt, and lima in Brazil.

The lack of acid, which protects orange juice against spoilage in other groups, renders them generally unfit for processing as juice, so they are primarily eaten. They remain profitable in areas of local consumption, but rapid spoilage renders them unsuitable for export to major population centres of Europe, Asia, or the United States.

Hybrid
Sweet oranges have also given rise to a range of hybrids, notably the grapefruit, which arose from a sweet orange x pomelo backcross. A spontaneous backcross of the grapefruit and sweet orange then resulted in the orangelo.  Spontaneous and engineered backcrosses between the sweet orange and mandarin oranges or tangerines has produced a group collectively known as tangors, which includes the clementine and Murcott.  More complex crosses have also been produced.  The so-called Ambersweet orange is actually a complex sweet orange x (Orlando tangelo x clementine) hybrid, legally designated a sweet orange in the United States so it can be used in orange juices.  The citranges are a group of intergeneric sweet orange x trifoliate orange hybrids.

Attributes

Sensory factors 

The taste of oranges is determined mainly by the relative ratios of sugars and acids, whereas orange aroma derives from volatile organic compounds, including alcohols, aldehydes, ketones, terpenes, and esters. Bitter limonoid compounds, such as limonin, decrease gradually during development, whereas volatile aroma compounds tend to peak in mid– to late–season development. Taste quality tends to improve later in harvests when there is a higher sugar/acid ratio with less bitterness. As a citrus fruit, the orange is acidic, with pH levels ranging from 2.9 to 4.0.

Sensory qualities vary according to genetic background, environmental conditions during development, ripeness at harvest, postharvest conditions, and storage duration.

Nutritional value and phytochemicals 
Orange flesh is 87% water, 12% carbohydrates, 1% protein, and contains negligible fat (see table). As a 100 gram reference amount, orange flesh provides 47 calories, and is a rich source of vitamin C, providing 64% of the Daily Value. No other micronutrients are present in significant amounts (see table).

Oranges contain diverse phytochemicals, including carotenoids (beta-carotene, lutein and beta-cryptoxanthin), flavonoids (e.g. naringenin) and numerous volatile organic compounds producing orange aroma, including aldehydes, esters, terpenes, alcohols, and ketones.

Orange juice contains only about one-fifth the citric acid of lime or lemon juice (which contain about 47 g/L).

Grading 

The United States Department of Agriculture (USDA) has established the following grades for Florida oranges, which primarily apply to oranges sold as fresh fruit: US Fancy, US No. 1 Bright, US No. 1, US No. 1 Golden, US No. 1 Bronze, US No. 1 Russet, US No. 2 Bright, US No. 2, US No. 2 Russet, and US No. 3. The general characteristics graded are color (both hue and uniformity), firmness, maturity, varietal characteristics, texture, and shape. Fancy, the highest grade, requires the highest grade of color and an absence of blemishes, while the terms Bright, Golden, Bronze, and Russet concern solely discoloration.

Grade numbers are determined by the amount of unsightly blemishes on the skin and firmness of the fruit that do not affect consumer safety. The USDA separates blemishes into three categories:
 General blemishes: ammoniation, buckskin, caked melanose, creasing, decay, scab, split navels, sprayburn, undeveloped segments, unhealed segments, and wormy fruit
 Injuries to fruit: bruises, green spots, oil spots, rough, wide, or protruding navels, scale, scars, skin breakdown, and thorn scratches
 Damage caused by dirt or other foreign material, disease, dryness, or mushy condition, hail, insects, riciness or woodiness, and sunburn.

The USDA uses a separate grading system for oranges used for juice because appearance and texture are irrelevant in this case. There are only two grades: US Grade AA Juice and US Grade A Juice, which are given to the oranges before processing. Juice grades are determined by three factors:
 The juiciness of the orange
 The amount of solids in the juice (at least 10% solids are required for the AA grade)
 The proportion of anhydric citric acid in fruit solids

Cultivation

Climate 

Like most citrus plants, oranges do well under moderate temperatures—between —and require considerable amounts of sunshine and water. It has been suggested the use of water resources by the citrus industry in the Middle East is a contributing factor to the desiccation of the region. Another significant element in the full development of the fruit is the temperature variation between summer and winter and, between day and night. In cooler climates, oranges can be grown indoors.

As oranges are sensitive to frost, there are different methods to prevent frost damage to crops and trees when subfreezing temperatures are expected. A common process is to spray the trees with water so as to cover them with a thin layer of ice that will stay just at the freezing point, insulating them even if air temperatures drop far lower. This is because water continues to lose heat as long as the environment is colder than it is, and so the water turning to ice in the environment cannot damage the trees. This practice, however, offers protection only for a very short time. Another procedure is burning fuel oil in smudge pots put between the trees. These devices burn with a great deal of particulate emission, so condensation of water vapour on the particulate soot prevents condensation on plants and raises the air temperature very slightly. Smudge pots were developed for the first time after a disastrous freeze in Southern California in January 1913 destroyed a whole crop.

Propagation 

It is possible to grow orange trees directly from seeds, but they may be infertile or produce fruit that may be different from its parent. For the seed of a commercial orange to grow, it must be kept moist at all times. One approach is placing the seeds between two sheets of damp paper towel until they germinate and then planting them, although many cultivators just set the seeds straight into the soil.

Commercially grown orange trees are propagated asexually by grafting a mature cultivar onto a suitable seedling rootstock to ensure the same yield, identical fruit characteristics, and resistance to diseases throughout the years. Propagation involves two stages: first, a rootstock is grown from seed. Then, when it is approximately one year old, the leafy top is cut off and a bud taken from a specific scion variety, is grafted into its bark. The scion is what determines the variety of orange, while the rootstock makes the tree resistant to pests and diseases and adaptable to specific soil and climatic conditions. Thus, rootstocks influence the rate of growth and have an effect on fruit yield and quality.

Rootstocks must be compatible with the variety inserted into them because otherwise, the tree may decline, be less productive, or die.

Among the several advantages to grafting are that trees mature uniformly and begin to bear fruit earlier than those reproduced by seeds (3 to 4 years in contrast with 6 to 7 years), and that it makes it possible to combine the best attributes of a scion with those of a rootstock.

Harvest 
Canopy-shaking mechanical harvesters are being used increasingly in Florida to harvest oranges. Current canopy shaker machines use a series of six-to-seven-foot-long tines to shake the tree canopy at a relatively constant  stroke and frequency.

Normally, oranges are picked once they are pale orange.

Degreening 
Oranges must be mature when harvested. In the United States, laws forbid harvesting immature fruit for human consumption in Texas, Arizona, California and Florida. Ripe oranges, however, often have some green or yellow-green color in the skin. Ethylene gas is used to turn green skin to orange. This process is known as "degreening", also called "gassing", "sweating", or "curing". Oranges are non-climacteric fruits and cannot post-harvest ripen internally in response to ethylene gas, though they will de-green externally.

Storage 

Commercially, oranges can be stored by refrigeration in controlled-atmosphere chambers for up to twelve weeks after harvest. Storage life ultimately depends on cultivar, maturity, pre-harvest conditions, and handling. In stores and markets, however, oranges should be displayed on non-refrigerated shelves.

At home, oranges have a shelf life of about one month. In either case, optimally, they are stored loosely in an open or perforated plastic bag.

Pests and diseases

Cottony cushion scale 
The first major pest that attacked orange trees in the United States was the cottony cushion scale (Icerya purchasi), imported from Australia to California in 1868. Within 20 years, it wiped out the citrus orchards around Los Angeles, and limited orange growth throughout California. In 1888, the USDA sent Alfred Koebele to Australia to study this scale insect in its native habitat. He brought back with him specimens of Novius cardinalis, an Australian ladybird beetle, and within a decade the pest was controlled.

Citrus greening disease 
The citrus greening disease, caused by the bacterium Liberobacter asiaticum, has been the most serious threat to orange production since 2010. It is characterized by streaks of different shades on the leaves, and deformed, poorly colored, unsavory fruit. In areas where the disease is endemic, citrus trees live for only five to eight years and never bear fruit suitable for consumption. In the western hemisphere, the disease was discovered in Florida in 1998, where it has attacked nearly all the trees ever since. It was reported in Brazil by Fundecitrus Brasil in 2004. As from 2009, 0.87% of the trees in Brazil's main orange growing areas (São Paulo and Minas Gerais) showed symptoms of greening, an increase of 49% over 2008.

The disease is spread primarily by two species of psyllid insects. One of them is the Asian citrus psyllid (Diaphorina citri Kuwayama), an efficient vector of the Liberobacter asiaticum. Generalist predators such as the ladybird beetles Curinus coeruleus, Olla v-nigrum, Harmonia axyridis, and Cycloneda sanguinea, and the lacewings Ceraeochrysa spp. and Chrysoperla spp. make significant contribution to the mortality of the Asian citrus psyllid, which results in 80–100% reduction in psyllid populations. In contrast, parasitism by Tamarixia radiata, a species-specific parasitoid of the Asian citrus psyllid, is variable and generally low in southwest Florida: in 2006, it amounted to a reduction of less than 12% from May to September and 50% in November.

In 2007, foliar applications of insecticides reduced psyllid populations for a short time, but also suppressed the populations of predatory ladybird beetles. Soil application of aldicarb provided limited control of Asian citrus psyllid, while drenches of imidacloprid to young trees were effective for two months or more.

Management of citrus greening disease is difficult and requires an integrated approach that includes use of clean stock, elimination of inoculum via voluntary and regulatory means, use of pesticides to control psyllid vectors in the citrus crop, and biological control of psyllid vectors in non-crop reservoirs. Citrus greening disease is not under completely successful management.

Greasy spot 
Greasy spot, a fungal disease caused by the Mycosphaerella citri, produces leaf spots and premature defoliation, thus reducing the tree's vigour and yield. Ascospores of M. citri are generated in pseudothecia in decomposing fallen leaves. Once mature, ascospores are ejected and subsequently dispersed by air currents.

Production 

In 2020, world production of oranges was 75 million tonnes, led by Brazil with 22% of the total, followed by India, China, the United States, and Mexico as other major producers (table).

In the United States, groves are located mainly in Florida, California, and Texas. The majority of California's crop is sold as fresh fruit, whereas Florida's oranges are destined to juice products. The Indian River area of Florida is known for the high quality of its juice, which often is sold fresh in the United States and frequently blended with juice produced in other regions because Indian River trees yield very sweet oranges, but in relatively small quantities.

Orange juice is traded internationally as frozen, concentrated orange juice to reduce the volume used so that storage and transportation costs are lower.

Products 

Oranges, whose flavor may vary from sweet to sour, are commonly peeled and eaten fresh or squeezed for juice. The thick bitter rind is usually discarded, but can be processed into animal feed by desiccation, using pressure and heat. It also is used in certain recipes as a food flavoring or garnish. The outermost layer of the rind can be thinly grated with a zester to produce orange zest. Zest is popular in cooking because it contains oils and has a strong flavor similar to that of the orange pulp. The white part of the rind, including the pith, is a source of pectin and has nearly the same amount of vitamin C as the flesh and other nutrients.

Although not as juicy or tasty as the flesh, orange peel is edible and has significant contents of vitamin C, dietary fiber, total polyphenols, carotenoids, limonene and dietary minerals, such as potassium and magnesium.

Orange juice is obtained by squeezing the fruit on a special tool (a juicer or squeezer) and collecting the juice in a tray underneath. This can be made at home or, on a much larger scale, industrially. Brazil is the largest producer of orange juice in the world, followed by the United States, where it is one of the commodities traded on the New York Board of Trade. Frozen orange juice concentrate is made from freshly squeezed and filtered orange juice.

Sweet orange oil is a by-product of the juice industry produced by pressing the peel. It is used for flavoring food and drinks and also in the perfume industry and aromatherapy for its fragrance. Sweet orange oil consists of approximately 90% D-limonene, a solvent used in various household chemicals, such as wood conditioners for furniture and—along with other citrus oils—detergents and hand cleansers. It is an efficient cleaning agent with a pleasant smell, promoted for being environmentally friendly and therefore, preferable to petrochemicals. D-limonene is, however, classified as irritating to the skin and as very toxic to aquatic life in different countries.

Marmalade preserves are traditionally made with Seville oranges, which are less sweet. All parts of the fruit are used: the pith and pips (separated and placed in a muslin bag) are boiled in a mixture of juice, slivered peel, sliced-up flesh, sugar, and water to extract their pectin, which helps the conserve to set.

See also 
 Eliza Tibbets (for the history of orange groves in California, United States)
 List of citrus fruits
 List of culinary fruits

References

External links 

 
 
 Citrus sinensis List of Chemicals (Dr. Duke's Phytochemical and Ethnobotanical Databases), USDA, Agricultural Research Service.
 Oranges: Safe Methods to Store, Preserve, and Enjoy. (2006). University of California Agriculture and Natural Resources. Accessed May 23, 2014.

 
Articles containing video clips
Cocktail garnishes
Crops originating from China
Fruits originating in Asia
Symbols of California
Symbols of Florida
Tropical agriculture